The Sinni (Latin: Siris or Semnus; Greek:  or ) is a 94 km long river in the Basilicata region of southern Italy. In antiquity, the city of Siris lay at its mouth. Near the town of Senise, a dam on the river was built in 1970-1982, the largest in Europe built with earth.

Geography
The source of the river is in the Lucan Apennines west of Castelsaraceno and south of Moliterno in the province of Potenza. The river flows south before curving eastward near Monte la Spina. It flows near Latronico before entering the Parco Nazionale del Pollino. The river is joined by a right tributary near Francavilla in Sinni before flowing into Lago di Monte Cotugno. The river exits the lake and forms the border between the province of Potenza and the province of Matera for a short distance before entering the province of Matera. The Sarmento River flows into the Sinni as a right tributary at the point where the Sinni leaves the Parco Nazionale del Pollino. The Sinni curves northeast and flows near Colobraro and Valsinni before curving southeast and finally flowing into the Gulf of Taranto south of Policoro.

History
The river Siris is mentioned by Lycophron (Alex. 982), as well as by Archilochus (ap. Athen. xii. p. 523); but the former author calls it , and its modern name of Sinno would seem to be derived from an ancient period; for we find mention in the Tabula Peutingeriana of a station 4 miles from Heracleia, the name of which is written Semnum, probably a corruption for Ad Simnum or Sinnum. The Siris and Aciris (modern Agri) are mentioned in conjunction by Pliny as well as by Strabo, and are two of the most considerable streams in Lucania. (Plin. iii. 11. s. 15; Strab. vi. p. 264.) The name of the former river is noticed also in connection with the first great battle between Pyrrhus and the Romans, 280 BCE, which was fought upon its banks (Plut. Pyrrh. 16). It has been confounded by Florus and Orosius with the Liri in Campania. (Flor. i. 18. § 7; Oros. iv. 1.)

References

External links

Drainage basins of the Ionian Sea
Rivers of the Province of Potenza
Rivers of the Province of Matera
Rivers of Italy
Braided rivers in Italy